Majaa is a 2005 Indian Tamil-language masala film directed by Shafi, starring Vikram, Asin, Pasupathy, Vadivelu, Anu Prabhakar, Vijayakumar, Manivannan, Murali and Biju Menon (in his Tamil debut). The music was composed by Vidyasagar. It tells the story of two adopted children changing from their old, mischievous ways of life. The film is a remake of Shafi's own Malayalam film Thommanum Makkalum.

Plot
Govindan is a thief who has two sons: Aadhi and Mathi. Years go by and the brothers decide to stop stealing, mend their ways, and lead a hardworking life with their father. They migrate to a neighboring village and meet a retired agricultural officer Chidambaram, who is in deep debt and is under pressure from the village landlord Kalingarayar to clear his debts. In efforts to help Chidambaram, Mathi confronts Seetha Lakshmi, Kalingarayar's daughter, who comes to collect the money Chidambaram owes her father. Seetha Lakshmi starts to acquire a liking for Mathi, but keeps it hidden due to her father's atrocious temper. In an attempt to teach Kalingarayar a lesson, Mathi forcibly ties the mangalsutram around Seetha's neck. Kalingarayar, realizing his daughter's love for Mathi, comes down to arrange a grand remarriage between the two. But things go awry when Manicka Vel, Seetha Lakshmi's maternal uncle, comes to town in an effort to stop the wedding between the two as he has wicked plans of marrying her and usurping her family fortune.

Cast

 Vikram as Mathi
Asin as Seetha Lakshmi 
 Pasupathy as Aadhi
 Vadivelu as Pulipaandi
 Manivannan as Govindan
 Anu Prabhakar as Selvi
 Biju Menon as Raja Velu
 Vijayakumar as Chidambaram
 Murali as Kalingarayar
 Nithin Sathya as Chidambaram's son
 T. P. Gajendran as Doctor
 Abu Salim as Manickam, Raja Velu's henchman 
 Sindu Tolani (special appearance in the song "Ayyarettu")
 Ram Lakshman (stunt choreographers) as Ramudu & Bheemudu

Production
Vikram watched the Mammootty starrer Thommanum Makkalum, and requested director Shafi to remake it with him, in Tamil. The film was launched at AVM Studios in 2005, a huge set of village was erected at studios. The film was launched at AVM Studios in 2005, a huge set of village was erected at studios. Initially, Trisha and Jyothika was considered for the lead female role, due to their unavailability Asin was chosen for the role. The crew went to Austria to shoot a song. Vikram worked as an assistant director under Shafi for this film.

Soundtrack

Release
The satellite rights of the film were sold to Raj TV. The film was released on 1 November 2005 on the Diwali Day.

Reception
Sify wrote:"The major flaw of Majaa is its wafer-thin story and screenplay, a mediocre subject to be remade from Malayalam, sic the film gives you a dreary sense of déjà vu, a feeling that one has seen it before".

Box office
It was declared as an average grosser.

References

External links
 

2005 films
Tamil remakes of Malayalam films
2000s Tamil-language films
Films scored by Vidyasagar
Rockline Entertainments films
2000s masala films
Indian action films
Films directed by Shafi
2005 action films